FiberHome Telecommunication Technologies Co., Ltd. is a major networking and telecommunication equipment provider in the People's Republic of China. Its headquarters is in Hongshan District, Wuhan, Hubei province, China. Founded in 1999, Fiberhome Networks was one of the 8 affiliated companies  and highly specializing on IP networks under the management of Fiberhome Company.

In May 2020, the U.S. Commerce Department's Bureau of Industry and Security said it was adding Fiberhome to its Entity List of organizations subject to Export Administration Regulations governing exports and other transactions. The Commerce Department said Fiberhome was “complicit” in alleged human rights abuses involving Muslim minority groups in the Xinjiang Uighur Autonomous Region (XUAR) in northwest China. U.S. companies will have to obtain special, hard-to-get licenses to do business with Fiberhome.

References

External links

Manufacturing companies based in Wuhan
Networking hardware companies
Telecommunications equipment vendors
Telecommunication equipment companies of China
Telecommunications companies established in 1999
Chinese brands
Chinese companies established in 1999
Companies listed on the Shanghai Stock Exchange